Vitaliy Korzh (born 5 October 1987) is a Ukrainian sprinter. He competed in the 4 × 100 metres relay event at the 2015 World Championships in Athletics in Beijing, China.

References

External links

1987 births
Living people
Ukrainian male sprinters
World Athletics Championships athletes for Ukraine
Universiade medalists in athletics (track and field)
Place of birth missing (living people)
Universiade gold medalists for Ukraine
Medalists at the 2013 Summer Universiade
20th-century Ukrainian people
21st-century Ukrainian people